Macroglossum pachycerus is a moth of the family Sphingidae. It is known from Madagascar.

It is similar to Macroglossum aesalon.

References

 Pinhey, E. (1962): Hawk Moths of Central and Southern Africa. Longmans Southern Africa, Cape Town.

Macroglossum
Moths described in 1903
Moths of Madagascar
Moths of Africa